Ransom, known in North America and some countries as The Terrorists, is a 1975 British neo noir crime film starring Sean Connery and Ian McShane and directed by Finnish director Caspar Wrede.

Plot
A small group of terrorists have seized the British ambassador to the fictitious country of "Scandinavia", and are holding him hostage in his residence. Scandinavia's head of security, Col. Nils Tahlvik (Sean Connery), wants to take an uncompromising position, but he is overruled by the governments of both Scandinavia and Britain, who insist that all of the terrorists' demands be met.

A passenger aeroplane arriving at the airport of Scandinavia's capital city is hijacked by another small group of terrorists, led by Ray Petrie (Ian McShane). The aeroplane ends up parked on an isolated taxiway, and Petrie demands that he be put in touch with Martin Shepherd (John Quentin), leader of the group holding the British ambassador hostage. Petrie, who is known by Shepherd, convinces Shepherd that his group and his hostages should leave on the hijacked airplane, not on a military plane as originally planned.

Tahlvik and his group of military commandos make several attempts to thwart the terrorists' plans, but nothing seems to work out for them. At the last minute, Tahlvik figures out that the "terrorists" on the airplane are actually British secret operatives intent on capturing Martin Shepherd, and that the British officials have been misleading the Scandinavian authorities and undermining Tahlvik's efforts to capture the two terrorist groups. He boards the aeroplane alone just before it is to take off, precipitating a shootout between the two groups that leaves both Shepherd and Petrie dead.

Cast
 Sean Connery as Col. Nils Tahlvik  
 Ian McShane as Ray Petrie  
 Jeffry Wickham as Capt. Frank Barnes
 Isabel Dean as Mrs. Palmer  
 John Quentin as Martin Shepherd (dubbed by Robert Lang)
 Robert Harris as Ambassador Palmer  
 James Maxwell as Bernhard  
 William Fox as Ferris  
 Harry Landis as Lookout Pilot - George Rawlings  
 Norman Bristow as Capt. Denver  
 John Cording as Bert  
 Christopher Ellison as Pete  
 Richard Hampton as Joe  
 Preston Lockwood as Brigadier Hislop  
 Karen Maxwell as Eva
 Gordon Honeycombe as the newsreader (uncredited)

Production

According to Michael Deeley, managing director of British Lion Films, the film was put together by British producer Peter Rawley. He arranged the script and engaged Sean Connery and Ian MacShane, then went to British Lion, who agreed to provide the $1.5 million budget. They sold US and Canadian rights to 20th Century Fox for $800,000, and sold the rights for the rest of the world for $1 million, making a comfortable profit.

Filming
Filming was carried out in Norway, with a large part of the filming taking place at Oslo Airport, Fornebu. Technical services were contracted to Norsk Film. The aircraft displayed in the hijacking is a Boeing 737-200 in the livery of Mey-Air.

Production started in January 1974. During production, Mey-Air defaulted on their payments to Boeing Commercial Aircraft, who sent representatives to Fornebu to repossess the aircraft on 26 February. Filming of the aircraft shots had begun but were not completed.

Media releases 
In 2003, the film made its region 1 DVD debut from 20th Century Fox Home Entertainment in a dual-sided disc with an anamorphic 1.66 widescreen version on side A, and a 1.33:1 full frame version on side B. This release sports the original English mono and is the US version with "The Terrorists" title and opens with the Fox logo. In Europe, the first region 2 DVD release was by Scanbox Entertainment utilizing a 1.33 transfer, followed by a German DVD release by StudioCanal in 1.66:1 anamorphic widescreen; both carry the UK "Ransom" title. In Australia, Umbrella Entertainment (under licence from StudioCanal) had put out a DVD release under "The Terrorists" title using the same transfer as the Fox DVD.

In 2012, Anchor Bay (under licence from 20th Century Fox) reissued it on DVD and gave it a Blu-Ray debut in the US. This release is the same transfer of "The Terrorists" US version as the 2003 Fox DVD, only with a 5.1 upmix in lieu of the original Mono and no other supplements. This release is now Out of Print.

In the UK, it received its DVD and Blu-ray debut by independent label Network (under licence from StudioCanal, owners of the British Lion/EMI catalog) in August 2014. Network's release utilizes a new 2k restoration of the UK "Ransom" version and opens with the British Lion logo. Its supplements are UK Teaser and Theatrical trailers under its "Ransom" title.

References

External links 
 
 
 
 
 
 
 RZeview at Cinema Retro

1975 films
British drama films
British Lion Films films
Films about terrorism
Films scored by Jerry Goldsmith
Films set in Europe
Films set in airports
Films set in a fictional country
Films about hostage takings
1970s English-language films
1970s British films